

Champions

Major League Baseball
World Series: New York Yankees over Milwaukee Braves (4–3); Bob Turley, MVP
All-Star Game, July 8 at Memorial Stadium: American League, 4–3

Other champions
College World Series: USC
1958 Japan Series: Nishitetsu Lions over Yomiuri Giants (4–3)
Little League World Series: Industrial, Monterrey, Mexico
Winter Leagues
1958 Caribbean Series: Tigres de Marianao
Cuban League: Tigres de Marianao
Dominican Republic League: Leones del Escogido
Mexican Pacific League: Venados de Mazatlán
Panamanian League: Carta Vieja Yankees
Puerto Rican League: Criollos de Caguas
Venezuelan League: Industriales de Valencia

Awards and honors
Most Valuable Player:
AL: Jackie Jensen, Boston Red Sox
NL: Ernie Banks, Chicago Cubs
Cy Young Award: Bob Turley, New York Yankees
Rookie of the Year:
AL: Albie Pearson, Washington Senators
NL: Orlando Cepeda, San Francisco Giants
Gold Glove Award:
Bobby Shantz (P) New York Yankees (AL) 
Sherm Lollar (C) Chicago White Sox (AL) 
Vic Power (1B) Cleveland Indians (AL) 
Nellie Fox (2B) Chicago White Sox (AL) 
Frank Malzone (3B) Boston Red Sox (AL) 
Luis Aparicio (SS) Chicago White Sox (AL) 
Minnie Miñoso (OF) Cleveland Indians (AL) 
Al Kaline (OF) Detroit Tigers (AL) 
Norm Siebern (OF) New York Yankees (AL)

MLB statistical leaders

Major league baseball final standings

American League final standings

National League final standings

Events

January
January 21 – For one season, the Philadelphia Phillies held an exclusive National League Television deal in New York City. As baseball in New York City was still reeling over the loss of their teams the Brooklyn Dodgers and the New York Giants, fans were able to see the Phillies on WOR television for half of their games (77 games).
January 28 – Los Angeles Dodgers catcher Roy Campanella suffers a broken neck in an early morning auto accident on Long Island. His spinal column is nearly severed and his legs are permanently paralyzed. Campanella will never play for the Dodgers after their move to Los Angeles, although a newspaper story (showing a picture of him wearing a Brooklyn cap) describes him as being of the Los Angeles Dodgers.
January 29 - The Cleveland Indians claim Mickey Vernon off waivers from the Boston Red Sox.

February
February 4 – The Baseball Hall of Fame fails to elect any new members for the first time since 1950.
February 6 – Ted Williams signs a one-year contract with the Boston Red Sox. Reports on the worth of the contract estimate from $135,000 to $150,000. Either way, Williams becomes the highest paid player in major league history.

March

April
April 1 - After acquiring him in the offseason, the Baltimore Orioles trade Larry Doby along with pitcher Don Ferrarese to the Cleveland Indians in exchange for pitcher Bud Daley, outfielder Gene Woodling and outfielder and future hall of fame manager Dick Williams. 
April 15 – In the first Major League Baseball game played on the West Coast, Rubén Gómez of the San Francisco Giants hurls an 8–0 shutout against the Los Angeles Dodgers. Giants' shortstop Daryl Spencer hits the first Major League home run on the Pacific Coast. A park-record 23,192 fans pack Seals Stadium to witness the historic game.
April 17 – Eddie Mathews hit two home runs and drove in five runs, to lead the Milwaukee Braves to a 6–1 victory over the Pittsburgh Pirates at Milwaukee County Stadium. Mathews also hit a pair of homers against the Pirates to start the season, as he becomes the first major league player to begin a season with consecutive two-homer games. The mark will be matched by Barry Bonds, who also hit a pair of homers in each of the San Francisco Giants first two games against the Los Angeles Dodgers to start the 2002 season.
April 25 – The Los Angeles Dodgers beats the St. Louis Cardinals, 5–3, setting a record for the most fans at a regular season night game, as 60,635 attend the game at the Los Angeles Coliseum.

May
May 11 – The St. Louis Cardinals set a National League record by using ten pinch hitters during a doubleheader. Despite walking fourteen batters in game one, St. Louis managed to top the Chicago Cubs, 8–7, and followed in game two with another 6–5 win. The Cardinals tied their own record two months later against the Pittsburgh Pirates on July 13.
May 12 – Willie Mays hits the first grand slam in San Francisco Giants history. Mays also belts another home run in a 12–3 victory over the rival Los Angeles Dodgers.
May 13
San Francisco Giants teammates Willie Mays and Daryl Spencer each have four extra-base hits as San Francisco beats the Dodgers in Los Angeles, 16–9. Mays hits two home runs, two triples, a single and drives in four runs, while Spencer has two home runs, a triple, a double and six RBI for a combined 28 total bases.
Stan Musial of the St. Louis Cardinals collects his 3,000th career hit when he pinch hit a double off Chicago Cubs pitcher Moe Drabowsky at Wrigley Field. The Cardinals win, 5–3.
May 23 – Willie Mays hit his 200th career home run, helping the San Francisco Giants beat the Milwaukee Braves, 5–3.
May 31 – Milwaukee Braves sluggers Hank Aaron, Eddie Mathews and Wes Covington hit one home run apiece on three consecutive pitches against Pittsburgh Pirates starter Ron Kline, as Milwaukee wins, 8–3.

June
June 3 - The San Francisco Giants sign undrafted free agent pitcher Gaylord Perry.
June 12 – In a shortstops transaction, the Cleveland Indians send Chico Carrasquel to the Kansas City Athletics in exchange for Billy Hunter.
June 15 – Chico Carrasquel went 5-for-6 with four runs batted in and scored two times, as the Kansas City Athletics edged the Boston Red Sox, 17–6, at Fenway Park. Héctor López collected four RBI, while Bob Cerv and Frank House added two runs and three RBI a piece. Ralph Terry was the winning pitcher and Jack Urban earned the save, while Willard Nixon got the loss. For Carrasquel, it was the fifth five-hit game of his career.
 The Cleveland Indians trade outfielder Roger Maris, pitcher Dick Tomanek, infielder/outfielder Preston Ward to the Kansas City Athletics in exchange for infielders Woodie Held and Vic Power.
June 27 – Against the Washington Senators at Comiskey Park, Billy Pierce of the Chicago White Sox has a perfect game broken up with two out in the ninth—by inches. Pinch-hitter Ed Fitz Gerald hits Pierce's first pitch down the right field line, the ball landing just inside the foul line for a double, the only hit Pierce allows in a 3–0 White Sox victory.
June 30 - The Detroit Tigers sign undrafted free agent pitcher Mickey Lolich.

July
July 2 - One day appearing in a game as a pinch hitter, the Cleveland Indians release pitcher Bob Lemon, ending Lemon's major league career, spent entirely with Cleveland. 
July 8 – At Memorial Stadium, home of the Baltimore Orioles, the American League defeated the National League, 4–3, in the All-Star Game. This was the first All-Star Game without an extra-base hit.
July 19 - The Atlanta Braves sign free agent pitcher Phil Niekro. 
July 20 – In the first game of a doubleheader at Fenway Park, Jim Bunning of the Detroit Tigers no-hits the Boston Red Sox 3–0.
July 28 – For the sixth time in his career, Mickey Mantle hits home runs from both sides of the plate. New York beats the Athletics, 14–7.

August
August 7 - The Pittsburgh Pirates sign amateur free agent Willie Stargell
August 14 – Vic Power of the Cleveland Indians steals home twice during a ten-inning, 10–9 win over the Detroit Tigers. Power's second swipe of home is the game-winner, as he steals only one other base all season long. Accomplished numerous times during the deadball era, no player other than Power has twice stolen home in a game since the 1927 season.
August 23 – At Yankee Stadium, Nellie Fox of the Chicago White Sox strikes out against Whitey Ford in the first inning of the White Sox' 7–1 victory over the New York Yankees. The strikeout ends Fox's streak of 98 consecutive games without striking out; he had last struck out on May 16 against Dick Tomanek of the Cleveland Indians.

September
September 13 – Milwaukee Braves ace Warren Spahn became the first left handed pitcher to win twenty or more games, nine times, after beating the St. Louis Cardinals 8–2. Previously, Eddie Plank and Lefty Grove each won twenty or more games, eight times.
September 14 – The New York Yankees sweep a doubleheader against the Kansas City Athletics, 5–3 and 12–7 (14 innings), clinching their fourth straight American League pennant.
September 20 – At Memorial Stadium, Hoyt Wilhelm of the Baltimore Orioles no-hits the New York Yankees 1–0, striking out eight along the way. It is the first no-hitter since the franchise's move to Baltimore. Wilhelm had pitched exclusively in relief prior to this season; this was only his ninth career start.
September 21 – The Milwaukee Braves clinch their second consecutive National League pennant with a 6–5 victory over the Cincinnati Reds, thus ensuring a Yankees-Braves World Series for the second straight year.

October
October 9 – The New York Yankees defeat the Milwaukee Braves, 6–2, in the decisive Game 7 of the World Series to win their eighteenth World Championship title. Yankees 1B Moose Skowron's three-run home run off Milwaukee pitcher Lew Burdette in the 8th inning puts the game on ice. The Yankees became only the second team to come back from a 3–1 deficit to win the World Series (the 1925 Pittsburgh Pirates were the first to do it). Milwaukee's Eddie Mathews strikes out for the 11th time, a record that will stand until 1980, when broken by Willie Wilson of the Kansas City Royals. The Braves' 53 strikeouts are also a new Series record. This is the seventh World Series title for manager Casey Stengel, tying him with Joe McCarthy for the most Series won. Yankees P Bob Turley is named the Series MVP.

November
November 12 – New York Yankees pitcher Bob Turley, who posted a 21–7 record with 168 strikeouts and a 2.97 earned run average, is named the MLB Cy Young Award. With only one award given for the two leagues, Turley gathers five votes to four for the previous winner, Warren Spahn of the Milwaukee Braves, who went 22–11 with 150 SO and a 3.07 ERA.
November 25 – Chicago Cubs slugger Ernie Banks, who hit a .313 average with 47 home runs and 129 RBI, is named National League MVP. Willie Mays of the San Francisco Giants is the runner-up, after going .347, 29, 96.
November 26 – Boston Red Sox outfielder Jackie Jensen, who hit .286 with 31 home runs and 122 RBI, is named American League MVP, winning over New York Yankees pitcher Bob Turley (21–7, 2.94 ERA), and Cleveland Indians outfielder Rocky Colavito (.303, 41, 113).
November 28 :
The American League announces that its Opening Day will be April 9 making it earliest date ever to open the junior circuit's regular season.
The Boston Red Sox sign teenage sensation Carl Yastrzemski to a reported bonus of $100,000. The future Hall of Famer will make his major league debut with Boston in the  season.
November 30 – Italian baseball commissioner Prince Borghese visits the United States to seek aid in organizing Italian teams.

December
December 2 :
International League President Frank Shaughnessy reports that club owners are sympathetic to player demands for a pension plan, but says there is no way that $250,000 can be raised to start one.
National League President Warren Giles says he doubts New York City will get a franchise for several years. He says the NL will reject expansion now, even if assured of a stadium and financial backing.
The Cleveland Indians send 2B Bobby Ávila to the Baltimore Orioles for P Russ Heman and cash consideration. In a separate trade, Cleveland sends 1B Vic Wertz and OF Gary Geiger to the Boston Red Sox in exchange for OF Jimmy Piersall.
December 4 – The American Association expands to 10 teams by admitting the Houston Buffaloes, Dallas Rangers and Fort Worth Cats from the Texas League. This effectively denudes the Texas League, leaving it with five teams and a vacancy.
December 30 - The Los Angeles Dodgers release shortstop Pee Wee Reese.

Movies
Damn Yankees
The Sandlot

Births

January
January   3 – Brian Allard
January   5 – Ron Kittle
January   7 – Carlos Diaz
January   9 – Bill Bordley
January 10 – Pat Keedy
January 12 – Rod Craig
January 13 – Gene Roof
January 19 – Rick Adair
January 20 – Bill Scherrer
January 24 – Neil Allen
January 24 – Atlee Hammaker
January 26 – Mike Patterson
January 31 – Rafael Santana

February
February   2 – Pat Tabler
February   6 – Bill Dawley
February   7 – Ralph Citarella
February   9 – Pete O'Brien
February 12 – Jim Beswick
February 12 – Ken Smith
February 13 – Frank Williams
February 17 – Mike Hart
February 17 – Alan Wiggins
February 18 – Rafael Ramírez
February 20 – Brian Snyder
February 21 – Alan Trammell
February 23 – Juan Agosto
February 23 – John Shelby
February 26 – Bob Hegman
February 26 – Darrell Miller
February 28 – Dallas Williams

March
March   2 – Jeff Stember
March   4 – Lorenzo Gray
March   7 – Albert Hall
March   8 – Nick Capra
March   9 – Brian Butterfield
March 10 – Steve Howe
March 11 – Larry Ray
March 24 – Bruce Hurst
March 26 – Chris Codiroli
March 29 – Domingo Ramos

April
April   1 – Mike Kinnunen
April   2 – Mike Howard
April   3 – Gary Pettis
April   6 – Leo Sutherland
April 11 – Jeff Calhoun
April 16 – Rick Grapenthin
April 19 – Ed Hodge
April 22 – Stefan Wever
April 24 – Bill Krueger
April 24 – Herman Segelke
April 25 – Dave Owen
April 26 – Bill Lyons
April 29 – Steve Crawford

May
May   5 – José Castro
May   5 – Dave Gumpert
May   6 – Keefe Cato
May   9 – Doug Loman
May 11 – Mark Huismann
May 11 – Walt Terrell
May 18 – Andre David
May 19 – Fritzie Connally
May 21 – Paul Runge
May 23 – Nelson Norman
May 24 – Mike Richardt
May 28 – Bill Doran
May 28 – Ed Olwine
May 29 – Jamie Allen
May 29 – Mike Stenhouse

June
June   2 – Jack O'Connor
June   4 – Ricky Jones
June   7 – Tim Laudner
June   8 – Carmen Castillo
June 15 – Wade Boggs
June 17 – Lester Strode
June 19 – Butch Davis
June 20 – Phil Huffman
June 20 – Dickie Thon
June 23 – Marty Barrett
June 24 – Tom Klawitter
June 28 – Clay Christiansen
June 28 – Rafael Vásquez

July
July 7 – Glenn Hoffman
July 7 – Tim Teufel
July 11 – Mike Fuentes
July 21 – Dave Henderson
July 22 – Tatsunori Hara
July 25 – Marc Sullivan
July 26 – Marty Bystrom
July 30 – Scott Fletcher

August
August   5 – Reid Nichols
August   8 – Alan Fowlkes
August   9 – Matt Young
August 11 – Dorn Taylor
August 12 – Rusty McNealy
August 15 – Joe Cowley
August 15 – Tom Dodd
August 15 – Bob James
August 15 – Randy Johnson
August 16 – Jim Maler
August 18 – Don Crow
August 19 – Luis DeLeón
August 19 – Gary Gaetti
August 23 – Julio Franco
August 31 – Von Hayes

September
September   4 – Rod Booker
September   4 – Paul Householder
September   7 – Bill Schroeder
September 11 – Brad Lesley
September 11 – Don Slaught
September 16 – Orel Hershiser
September 17 – Tom Waddell
September 18 – Scott Holman
September 18 – Roger Mason
September 20 – Jim Siwy
September 22 – Dave Sax
September 24 – Jim Acker
September 25 – Ron Mathis
September 25 – Larry White
September 28 – Pete Filson
September 28 – Jerry Layne
September 28 – Rob Manfred
September 28 – Ronn Reynolds

October
October   3 – Daryl Sconiers
October   5 – Randy Bush
October   5 – Brent Gaff
October 25 – Tom Romano
October 25 – Dave Von Ohlen
October 26 – Ed Vande Berg
October 26 – Frank Wills
October 31 – Ray Soff
October 31 – Paul Zuvella

November
November   1 – Rich Thompson
November   2 – Willie McGee
November   5 – Mike Bishop
November   5 – Tom Wiedenbauer
November   7 – Reggie Patterson
November   8 – Bobby Moore
November   8 – Paul Wilmet
November 10 – Omar Minaya
November 13 – Dan Petry
November 16 – Paul Serna
November 18 – Cliff Pastornicky
November 19 – Mike Winters
November 21 – Mike Mason
November 22 – Lee Guetterman
November 22 – Ricky Wright
November 25 – Chico Walker
November 27 – Mike Scioscia
November 28 – Pat Murphy
November 28 – Dave Righetti
November 30 – Toby Hernández
November 30 – Steve Shields

December
December   3 – Mike Martin
December   5 – Scott Munninghoff
December 10 – Dom Chiti
December 16 – Rondin Johnson
December 16 – Ted Wilborn
December 18 – Scott Nielsen
December 22 – Glenn Wilson
December 22 – George Wright
December 23 – Tim Leary
December 25 – Gerry Davis
December 25 – Rickey Henderson

Deaths

January
January 10 – John Terry, 80, pitcher who played with the Detroit Tigers in 1902 and for the St. Louis Browns in 1903. 
January 12 – Lefty Webb, 72, pitcher for the 1910 Pittsburgh Pirates.
January 23 – Harry Baldwin, 57, pitcher who played from 1924 to 1925 for the New York Giants.
January 23 – Walter Lonergan, 72, shortstop for the 1911 Boston Red Sox.
January 23 – Al Tedrow, 66, who pitched in four games for the Cleveland Naps in 1914.
January 24 – Admiral Schlei, 80, catcher for the Cincinnati Reds and New York Giants over eight seasons from 1904 to 1911.
January 31 – Harry O'Donnell, 63, backup catcher for the Philadelphia Phillies in its 1927 season.

February
February   1 – Mysterious Walker, 73, University of Chicago three-sport athlete with colorful personality, who later pitched for three major league teams from 1910 to 1913 before jumping to the outlaw Federal League in 1914–15, whose unusual moniker came after debuting professionally in the minors with the PCL San Francisco Seals, because he refused to take the field until umpires banished photographers, apparently trying to get away from public scrutiny, although curiously attracting attention as a ballplayer.
February   4 – Ted Turner, 85, pitcher who appeared in just one game for the Chicago Cubs in its 1920 season.
February   9 – Cowboy Jones, 83, 19th century pitcher who played with the Cleveland Spiders in 1898 and for the St. Louis Perfectos/Cardinals over three seasons from 1899 to 1901.
February 10 – Elmer Jacobs, 65, starting pitcher who played for six different clubs in a span of nine seasons from 1914 to 1927, being named the Opening Day starter for the Pittsburgh Pirates in 1917 and the Philadelphia Phillies in 1919.
February 28 – Henry Smoyer, 67, utility man who played in 1912 for the St. Louis Browns of the American League.

March
March   9 – Skel Roach, 86, German-born pitcher for the Chicago Orphans during the 1899 season, who also spent nine seasons in the Minors Leagues between 1895 and 1905, and was hired as baseball coach by the University of Michigan in 1903.
March 10 – Leon Cadore, 68, starting pitcher for the Brooklyn Robins, Chicago White Sox and New York Giants over ten seasons from 1915 to 1924, who shares an MLB record for the most innings pitched in a single game while pitching for Brooklyn in 1920, when he joined fellow Boston Braves starter Joe Oeschger to pitch 26 innings without relief, which eventually ended in darkness and a 1–1 tie.
March 10 – Earl Williams, 55, backup catcher for the 1928 Boston Braves.
March 17 – Bob Blewett, 80, pitcher who played with the New York Giants in its 1902 season.
March 20 – Gene Dale, 68, who pitched for the St. Louis Cardinals and the Cincinnati Reds in a span of four seasons from 1911 to 1916.
March 23 – Harry Kelley, 52, pitcher who played for the Washington Senators and Philadelphia Athletics in all or part of six seasons between 1925 and 1939; led American League in games lost (21) in 1937.
March 25 – Al Shaw, 84, English-born catcher who played for the Detroit Tigers, Boston Americans, Chicago White Sox and Boston Doves, in part of four seasons spanning 1901–1909.
March 25 – Clarence Kraft, 70, first baseman who appeared in three games for the Boston Braves in the 1914 season.
March 28 – Chuck Klein, 53, Hall of Fame slugging right fielder and two-time All-Star, primarily with the Philadelphia Phillies, who collected a career .320 batting average with 300 home runs and 1,201 runs batted in and is the only player in 20th century to collect 200 or more hits in each of his first five full MLB seasons, while winning the National League MVP award in 1932 and a Triple Crown in 1933, to accompany his four home run titles, four home runs in one game, two RBI titles, a stolen base title and leading in runs scored three years in a row, setting a modern National League record with 158 runs in 1930 and leading all outfielders in assists three times, establishing in 1930 a Major League record for outfield assists with 44 which, like his runs scored mark, this record still stands as of the 2017 season.
March 28 – Gus Thompson, 80, who pitched with the Pittsburgh Pirates in 1903 and for the St. Louis Cardinals in 1906.
March 29 – Jimmy Archer, 74, Irish-born catcher who spent his career with six different teams, primarily for the Chicago Cubs from 1909 through 1917.

April
April 10 – Hod Leverette, 68, pitcher for the 1920 St. Louis Browns.
April 14 – John Freeman, 57, reserve outfielder who played briefly for the Boston Red Sox in their 1927 season.
April 14 – Red Smyth, 65, outfielder who played from 1915 through 1918 with the Brooklyn Robins and St. Louis Cardinals. 
April 20 – Chet Nourse, 70, pitcher for the 1909 Boston Red Sox.

May
May   3 – Al Maul, 92, 19th century pitcher who played for ten different clubs over 15 seasons spanning 1884–1901, compiling an 84–80 career record in 188 games, while leading the National Leaque with a 2.45 earned run average in the 1895 season. 
May   5 – Ollie Chill, 79, umpire who worked 1,028 American League games (1914–1966, 1919–1922), plus eight games of the 1921 World Series
May 14 – Billy Clingman, 88, 19th century third baseman and shortstop who played for seven teams in a span of ten seasons from 1890 to 1903.
May 20 – Frank Bird, 89, 19th century catcher who played in 1892 for the St. Louis Browns of the National League.
May 20 – Cotton Minahan, 75, pitcher for the 1907 Cincinnati Reds.
May 20 – Frank Bird, 89, Former catcher for the St. Louis Cardinals.
May 28 – Kid Nance, 81, outfielder who played with the Louisville Colonels of the National League from 1897 to 1898, and then for the Detroit Tigers of the American League in 1901.
May 26 – Dwight Wertz, 69, shortstop for the 1914 Buffalo Buffeds of the outlaw Federal League, who was better known for his professional American football career in the Ohio League over three seasons between 1912 and 1914, where he won three consecutive championship titles while playing for different teams.

June
June   6 – Bert Daniels, 75, speedy outfielder who played for the New York Highlanders and Yankees in four seasons from 1910 to 1913, and for the Cincinnati Reds in 1914.
June   9 – John Fick, 37, who pitched in four games with the 1944 Philadelphia Phillies.
June 10 – John Vann, 68, catcher who made an appearance as a pinch hitter for the St. Louis Cardinals in 1913.
June 13 – Tom Stankard, 76, infielder for the Pittsburgh Pirates in its 1904 season.
June 16 – Jack Phillips, 76, pitcher who appeared in just une game for the 1945 New York Giants.
June 23 – George Boehler, 66, valuable swingman pitcher whose career spanned 20 years including major league stints with the Detroit Tigers St. Louis Browns, Pittsburgh Pirates and Brooklyn Robins over nine seasons from 1912 to 1926, while collecting 20 or more wins in seven minor league seasons, with a career-high 38 wins for the Tulsa Oilers of the Western League in 1922.

July
July   2 – Carlos Moore, 51, relief pitcher in four games for the 1930 Washington Senators.
July   2 – Yip Owens, 72, Canadian catcher who played for the Boston Americans, Chicago White Sox, Brooklyn Tip-Tops and Baltimore Terrapins in part of four seasons spanning 1905–1915.
July   3 – Paul Smith, 70, left fielder for the 1916 Cincinnati Reds.
July   7 – John Sullivan, 64, pitcher who played for the Chicago White Sox in its 1919 season.
July   8 – Bill McAfee, 50, pitcher who played for the Chicago Cubs, Boston Braves, Washington Senators and St. Louis Browns in a span of five seasons from 1930 to 1934.
July 22 – Grover Land, 73, catcher who played for the Cleveland Naps in part of three seasons from 1908 to 1913 before joining the Brooklyn Tip-Tops in 1914–1915.
July 24 – Virgil Barnes, 63, pitcher who played from 1919 through 1928 for the New York Giants and Boston Braves.
July 25 – Dizzy Nutter, 74, outfielder for the 1919 Boston Braves.
July 26 – Walter Bernhardt, 65, pitcher who appeared in one game with the New York Yankees in 1918.
July 27 – Art Corcoran, 63, two-sport athlete who played as a third baseman for the Philadelphia Athletics in 1915, and served as a halfback for five National Football League teams over four seasons from 1920 to 1923.
July 27 – Phil Page, 52, southpaw pitcher who appeared in 31 games for the Detroit Tigers from 1928 to 1930 and Brooklyn Dodgers in 1934; minor league manager and scout for the New York Yankees; MLB coach for the Cincinnati Reds from 1947 through 1952.
July 28 – Lu Blue, 61, World War I veteran who put together a solid 13-year major league career after his discharge, playing first base with the Detroit Tigers from 1921 to 1924, being traded to the St. Louis Browns in 1927 and staying with them until 1931, when he joined the Chicago White Sox for two years before ending his career with the Brooklyn Dodgers in 1933, collecting a .287/.402/.401 batting line with a .989 fielding average, being ranked as the 77th best first baseman in Major League history, according to baseball historian Bill James.

August
August   1 – Ike Boone, 61, part-time MLB outfielder who hit a .321/.394/.475 line with 26 home runs and 194 runs batted in through 356 games with four major-league clubs from 1922 to 1932; nevertheless, Boone is remembered as one of the greatest minor-leaguers of all-time: he led the Texas League in 1923 with a .402 batting average and 125 RBI while playing for the San Antonio Bears, posting a league-record 35-game hitting streak during the season, as his 241 base hits obliterated the league record; afterwards, Boone played for the Mission Reds of the Pacific Coast League in 1929, hitting .407 with 55 homers and 218 RBI, setting a league record with 553 total bases while delivering 323 hits, two hits short of matching the all-time PCL record for hits in a single season, set by Paul Strand with 325 hits; overall, Boone batted .300 or better in 12 of his 14 minors seasons, including .400 or more four times; inducted into the International League Hall of Fame and the Pacific Coast League Hall of Fame.
August   4 – Bob Gamble, 91, 19th-century pitcher who played in 1888 for the Philadelphia Athletics of the American Association.
August   8 – Fred Winchell, 76, Canadian pitcher who appeared in four games for the Cleveland Naps in its 1909 season.
August 18 – Archie Stimmel, 85, pitcher who played from 1900 through 1902 for the Cincinnati Reds.
August 21 – George Quellich, 52, left fielder who played 13 games for the 1931 Detroit Tigers, all as a replacement for the team's slugger John Stone, but earned his place in baseball history by setting a record that has never been equaled at any level of professional baseball, with fifteen consecutive hits while playing for the Reading Coal Barons of the International League in 1929, which included one grand slam, four home runs, a double and ten singles. Immediately following the end of his string, Quellich collected 13 hits in his next 18 at-bats.
August 22 – Dummy Taylor, 83, the only successful deaf pitcher in Major League Baseball, who was a vital part of the New York Giants in the early years of the 20th Century, helping them clinch three National League pennants and the 1905 World Series title.
August 23 – Bill Breckinridge, 50, pitcher who played for the 1929 Philadelphia Athletics.
August 28 – Jean Dubuc, 69, pitcher for the Cincinnati Reds, Detroit Tigers, Boston Red Sox and New York Giants in all or part of nine seasons spanning 1908–1919, whose name was mentioned during the Black Sox Scandal investigation in the Summer of 1921, but he was neither a participant nor a conspirator in the scandal, even though he was pursued for his guilty knowledge of the fix.
August 28 – Eddie Stack, 70, pitcher who played for the Philadelphia Phillies, Brooklyn Dodgers and Chicago Cubs in a span of five seasons from 1910 to 1914.
August 28 – Sid Womack, 61, backup catcher for the 1926 Boston Braves.
August 30 – Frank Demaree, 48, two-time All-Star outfielder whose career included stints with the Chicago Cubs, New York Giants, Boston Braves, St. Louis Cardinals and St. Louis Browns over twelve seasons from 1932 to 1944, winning four National League pennants with the Cubs (1932; 1935; 1938) and Cardinals (1943), as well as one American League pennant with the Browns (1944), being also one of four players to reach the 30–30 club in Pacific Coast League history (1934), along with Hall of Famer Tony Lazzeri (1925), Lefty O'Doul (1927) and Joc Pederson (2014).

September
September   4 – Red Killefer, 73, who spent 35 years in Organized Baseball as a player, coach, manager, team president and owner of a minor league team named after him, being known as a hot-tempered, fiery and passionate utility man able to play any position but pitcher in a seven-year, major league career with the Detroit Tigers, Washington Senators, Cincinnati Reds and New York Giants from 1907 to 1916, and later becoming a successful manager minor league manager for 25 years from 1917 to 1941, while compiling a managerial record of 1,940–1,800 (519), 13th best in minor league history; brother of "Reindeer" Bill Killefer.
September   4 – Ward Miller, 74, fourth outfielder for the Pittsburgh Pirates, Cincinnati Reds, Chicago Cubs, St. Louis Terriers and St. Louis Browns over part of eight seasons spanning 1909–1917.
September   6 – Tommy de la Cruz, 46, Cuban pitcher for the 1944 Cincinnati Reds, who was one of many ballplayers to appear only in the majors during World War II.
September   6 – Hugh Hill, 79, outfielder who played with the Cleveland Naps in 1903 and for the St. Louis Cardinals in 1904.
September   7 – Wally Gilbert, 57, third baseman who played from 1928 through 1932 for the Brooklyn Robins and Cincinnati Reds.
September 10 – Arlas Taylor, 82, pitcher for the 1921 Philadelphia Athletics.
September 15 – Snuffy Stirnweiss, 39, two-time All-Star second baseman who played for the New York Yankees between 1943 and 1950, winning three World Series rings with them and the 1945 American League batting championship with a .309 average, leading also the league twice in runs scored, hits, triples and stolen bases, and once in slugging and total bases.
September 23 – Bill Mundy, 69, first baseman for the 1913 Boston Red Sox. 
September 24 – Bill Jackson, 58, outfielder and first baseman who played from 1914 to 1915 for the Chicago Whales club of the outlaw Federal League.
September 26 – Raleigh Aitchison, 70, pitcher who played for the Brooklyn Dodgers and Robins teams in part of three seasons spanning 1911–1915.
September 27 – Joe Berry, 53, pitcher for the Chicago Cubs, Philadelphia Athletics and Cleveland Indians over four seasons from 1942 to 1946.

October
October   2 – Bill Forman, 71, pitcher for the Washington Senators over two seasons from 1909 to 1910.
October   7 – Chick Brandom, 71, pitcher who played with the Pittsburgh Pirates and Newark Peppers in a span of three seasons from 1908 to 1915.
October 11 − Ira Thomas, 77, catcher who played from 1906 through 1915 for the New York Highlanders, Detroit Tigers and Philadelphia Athletics, being also a member of three Athletics clubs that won the World Series from 1910 to 1911 and 1913.
October 20 – Rex Dawson, 69, pitcher for the 1913 Washington Senators.
October 21 – Lep Long, 70, pitcher who made four game appearances with the Philadelphia Athletics in its 1911 season.
October 26 – Erwin Renfer, 65, pitcher for the 1913 Detroit Tigers.

November
November   3 – Heinie Sand, 61, shortstop who played for the Philadelphia Phillies in a span of six seasons from 1923 to 1928.
November   3 – John Eubank, 86, swingman pitcher who played for the Detroit Tigers over three seasons from 1905 to 1907.
November   6 – Ernie Diehl, 81, backup outfielder who played for the Pittsburgh Pirates, Boston Beaneaters and Boston Doves in part of four seasons spanning 1903–1909.
November   6 – Al Mattern, 75, pitcher who played for the Boston Doves, Rustlers and Braves teams from 1908 to 1912.
November   9 – Walt Meinert, 67, right fielder for the 1913 St. Louis Browns.
November 13 – Heinie Elder, 68, pitcher for the Detroit Tigers in its 1913 season.
November 14 – Jack Owens, 50, catcher who played in two games with the Philadelphia Athletics in 1935.
November 15 – Harry Riconda, 61, third baseman who played with the Philadelphia Athletics, Boston Braves, Brooklyn Robins, Pittsburgh Pirates and Cincinnati Reds in part of six seasons between 1923 and 1930.
November 17 – Mort Cooper, 45, pitcher for the St. Louis Cardinals, Boston Braves, New York Giants and Chicago Cubs over 12 seasons from 1938 to 1949; selected to four National League All-Star teams (1942–1943 and 1945–1946); led NL with 22 wins, 10 shutouts and a 1.78 ERA in 1942, earning Most Valuable Player honors, while anchoring Cardinals' pitching staff during three consecutive pennant-winning seaons (1942–1944), when he won over 20 games three times and earned two World Series rings (1942, 1944); brother Walker, an All-Star catcher, was frequently his battery mate.
November 20 – Bill Lathrop, 67, pitcher who played for the Chicago White Sox in part of two seasons from 1913 to 1914.
November 21 – Mel Ott, 49, Hall of Fame right fielder and 12-time All-Star who played his 22-season big league career with the New York Giants from 1926 to 1947; jumped from his high school team into the majors as a 17-year-old, and a member of Giants' 1933 World Series champions; led the National League in home runs and walks six times, in runs scored, triples and outfield double plays twice, and in runs batted in once, ending his career with a .304/.414/.533 batting line, 511 home runs, 488 doubles, 2,876 hits, 9,456 runs and 1,860 RBI in 2,730 games played; also managed Giants from 1942 to July 15, 1948, to a 464–530 (.467) record; becoming a broadcaster, he served on the Detroit Tigers' radio/TV team from 1956 until his death.
November 24 – Roy Corhan, 71, shortstop who played with the Chicago White Sox in 1911 and for the St. Louis Cardinals in 1916.

December
December   4 – Red Murray, 74, right fielder for three National League clubs from 1906 to 1917, whose combination of power, fielding and speed on the bases guided the New York Giants to three pennants from 1911 to 1913, while leading all outfielders in assists in 1909 and 1910, becoming the only outfielder in the modern era to accumulate more than 100 assists during the period of 1907 to 1910, and also one of only three players in the same period to finish twice among the top five in home runs and stolen bases during the same season (1908–1909), joining Honus Wagner (1907–1908) and  Ty Cobb (1909–1910).
December   8 – Bernie Friberg, 59, valuable utility man who was able to play all nine defensive positions in a 14-season career for the Chicago Cubs, Philadelphia Phillies and Boston Red Sox between 1919 and 1933.
December   8 – Tris Speaker, 70, Hall of Fame center fielder highly regarded for both his batting and his fielding in a 22-year career, who earned American League MVP honors in 1912 and led the Boston Red Sox to a World Series title, then another World Series title in 1915, also carrying the Cleveland Indians to its first World Series championship in 1920 as a player/manager, while compiling 3,514 hits and posting a .345 career average –sixth on the all-time list– including 792 doubles –a career record that nobody has surpassed–, and leading the league in putouts seven times and in double plays six times, as his career totals in both categories are still major-league records at his position.
December   9 – Rube Vickers, 80, pitcher who played from 1902 through 1909 for the Brooklyn Superbas, Cincinnati Reds, and Philadelphia Athletics.
December 10 – Cozy Dolan, 75, outfielder/third baseman who played 379 games for six teams, primarily the St. Louis Cardinals, over seven years spanning 1909 to 1922; as coach for 1921–1924 New York Giants, he was a part of four National League and two World Series (1921, 1922) champions, but was suspended for life by Commissioner Kenesaw Mountain Landis after being implicated in a scheme to bribe a Philadelphia player to deliberately lose the last game of 1924 season. 
December 15 – Harry Heitmann, 62, pitcher for the 1918 Brooklyn Robins.
December 16 – Bill Corum, 63, New York sportswriter and sportscaster who covered the 1920s Brooklyn Robins and New York Giants and later worked World Series games on radio alongside Red Barber; became best known for announcing the Kentucky Derby and as a key figure in thoroughbred racing.
December 16 – Les Scarsella, 45, first baseman and left fielder who played with the Cincinnati Reds and Boston Bees in part of four seasons between 1935 and 1940.
December 24 – Jim Boyle, 54, catcher for the New York Giants, who has the distinction of having one of the shortest known Major League Baseball careers, while catching for only one inning in a game against the Pittsburgh Pirates on June 20, 1926, without registering an at bat appearance. 
December 30 – Jim Hickman, 66, backup outfielder for the Baltimore Terrapins and Brooklyn Robins in four seasons from 1915 to 1919.
December 30 – Glenn Spencer, 53, pitcher who played from 1928 to 1933 with the Pittsburgh Pirates and New York Giants.
December 31 – Jack Doyle, 89, Irish-born first baseman whose solid 17-year playing career includes a National League Championship with the Baltimore Orioles in 1896 and two stints as manager of the New York Giants in 1895 and the Washington Senators in 1898, while leading the National League first basemen with 96 assists in 1900 and  1.418 putouts in 1903, and collecting a career slash line of .299/.351/.385 with 971 runs batted in and 518 stolen bases in 1,569 games.

Sources

External links

Baseball Almanac - Major League Baseball Players Who Were Born in 1958
Baseball Almanac – Major League Baseball Players Who Died in 1958
Baseball Reference – 1958 MLB Season Summary  
ESPN – 1958 MLB Season History